Heiko Enderling is a German-American mathematical biologist and mathematical oncologist whose research topics include radiotherapy, tumor-immune interactions, cancer stem cells, and dynamic biomarkers. He is a Senior Member in the Department of Integrated Mathematical Oncology at Moffitt Cancer Center, editor of the Bulletin of Mathematical Biology, and president of the Society for Mathematical Biology (2021–2023).

Education and career 
Enderling graduated from Otto von Guericke University Magdeburg with a degree in Computervisualistik in 2003, and completed his PhD at the University of Dundee in 2006. His dissertation, Mathematical modelling of breast tumour development, treatment and recurrence, was jointly supervised by Mark Chaplain, Glenn Rowe, and Alexander Anderson.

After postdoctoral research at Tufts University, he was an assistant professor at Tufts University from 2010 to 2013 before moving to Moffitt Cancer Center. At Moffitt, he directs a research group on Quantitative Personalized Oncology, with the goal to integrate quantitative modeling into oncology decision making.

He is president of the Society for Mathematical Biology from 2021 to 2023, the major academic society in the field.

Publications
His most cited papers are:

Recognition 
Enderling was named a Centennial Postdoctoral Fellow of the American Association for Cancer Research in 2008, and Fellow of the Society for Mathematical Biology in 2021.

References

External links 

 EnderlingLab

Year of birth missing (living people)
21st-century German mathematicians
Alumni of the University of Dundee
Otto von Guericke University Magdeburg alumni
Tufts University faculty
Theoretical biologists
German expatriates in the United States
German expatriates in the United Kingdom
Living people